The commandant of the Marine Corps (CMC) is normally the highest-ranking officer in the United States Marine Corps and is a member of the Joint Chiefs of Staff. The CMC reports directly to the secretary of the Navy and is responsible for ensuring the organization, policy, plans, and programs for the Marine Corps as well as advising the president, the secretary of defense, the National Security Council, the Homeland Security Council, and the secretary of the Navy on matters involving the Marine Corps. Under the authority of the secretary of the Navy, the CMC designates Marine personnel and resources to the commanders of unified combatant commands. The commandant performs all other functions prescribed in Section 8043 in Title 10 of the United States Code or delegates those duties and responsibilities to other officers in his administration in his name. As with the other joint chiefs, the commandant is an administrative position and has no operational command authority over United States Marine Corps forces.

The commandant is nominated for appointment by the president, for a four-year term of office, and must be confirmed by the Senate. The commandant can be reappointed to serve one additional term, but only during times of war or national emergency declared by Congress. By statute, the commandant is appointed as a four-star general while serving in office. "The commandant is directly responsible to the Secretary of the Navy for the total performance of the Marine Corps. This includes the administration, discipline, internal organization, training, requirements, efficiency, and readiness of the service. The Commandant is also responsible for the operation of the Marine Corps material support system." Since 1806, the official residence of the commandant has been located in the Marine Barracks in Washington, D.C., and his main offices are in Arlington County, Virginia.

Responsibilities
The responsibilities of the commandant are outlined in Title 10, Section 5043, the United States Code and the position is "subject to the authority, direction, and control of the Secretary of the Navy". As stated in the U.S. Code, the commandant "shall preside over the Headquarters, Marine Corps, transmit the plans and recommendations of the Headquarters, Marine Corps, to the Secretary and advise the Secretary with regard to such plans and recommendations, after approval of the plans or recommendations of the Headquarters, Marine Corps, by the Secretary, act as the agent of the Secretary in carrying them into effect, exercise supervision, consistent with the authority assigned to commanders of unified or specified combatant commands under chapter 6 of this title, over such of the members and organizations of the Marine Corps and the Navy as the Secretary determines, perform the duties prescribed for him by section 171 of this title and other provisions of law and perform such other military duties, not otherwise assigned by law, as are assigned to him by the President, the Secretary of Defense, or the Secretary of the Navy".

List of commandants
38 men have served as the commandant of the Marine Corps. The first commandant was Samuel Nicholas, who took office as a captain, though there was no office titled "Commandant" at the time, and the Second Continental Congress had authorized that the senior-most marine could take a rank up to Colonel. The longest-serving was Archibald Henderson, sometimes referred to as the "Grand old man of the Marine Corps" due to his thirty-nine-year tenure. In the history of the United States Marine Corps, only one Commandant has ever been fired from the job: Anthony Gale, as a result of a court-martial in 1820.

|}

Timeline

See also
 Assistant Commandant of the Marine Corps
 Military Secretary to the Commandant of the Marine Corps
 Sergeant Major of the Marine Corps

References

Notes

General

External links 

 

Joint Chiefs of Staff

United States Marine Corps leadership
United States Marine Corps lists